The Boxing Tournament at the 1999 All-Africa Games was held in Johannesburg, South Africa from 10 to 18 September. It served as a qualification tournament for the 2000 Summer Olympics in Sydney, Australia. The number one and two earned a ticket for the Olympic tournament.

Medal winners

References
1. Robert Osiobe Enenuwedia (NGA) was disqualified after positive drug test in semi-finals

References

External links
Results
Amateur Boxing

1999 All-Africa Games
Boxing at the African Games
A